The women's long jump athletics events for the 2016 Summer Paralympics take place at the Rio Olympic Stadium from 8 September. A total of 8 events are contested for 8 different classifications.

Competition format 
The competition for each classification consisted of a single round containing the full field. No qualification heats were organised. During competition, each athlete jumped three times, after which the eight best jumped three more times (with the best distance of the six jumps counted towards the final ranking).

Medal summary

Results

T11
The T11 event took place on 16 September.

T12

The T12 event took place on 13 September.

T20
The T20 event took place on 15 September.

T37
The T37 event took place on 14 September.

T38
The T38 event took place on 11 September.

T42
The T42 event took place on 10 September.

T44
The T44 event took place on 9 September. The event incorporates athletes from classification T43 in addition to T44.

T47
The T47 event took place on 8 September. The event incorporates athletes from classifications T45 and T46 in addition to T47.

References

Athletics at the 2016 Summer Paralympics